Gareth Kyle Berg (born 18 January 1981) is a South African-born English-Italian cricketer who plays for Northamptonshire County Cricket Club. Born in South Africa, he attended Edgemead Primary School and then SACS (South African College School) . He is not considered a Kolpak player, and is qualified by residency for England as well as holding an Italian passport. In January 2021, Berg was named as the head coach of the Italian cricket team.

Career
Berg's career began at Western Province where he appeared in a handful of one day matches, before moving to England where he signed with Northamptonshire, playing second XI cricket for the county. He signed with Middlesex in 2007, again playing in the second XI before breaking into the first team in 2008, making his List A debut against Surrey at the Oval and his First Class debut a few days later at Lord's against Glamorgan. He received his county cap in 2010.

He played for Italy in the 2012 ICC World Twenty20 qualifiers. In May 2019, he was named in Italy's squad for the Regional Finals of the 2018–19 ICC T20 World Cup Europe Qualifier tournament in Guernsey.

On 30 August 2019, it was confirmed that Berg would join Northamptonshire on loan for the remainder of the 2019 season, ahead of a permanent move from 2020 onwards. In November 2019, he was named in Italy's squad for the Cricket World Cup Challenge League B tournament in Oman. In September 2021, he was named as the captain of Italy's Twenty20 International (T20I) squad for the Regional Final of the 2021 ICC Men's T20 World Cup Europe Qualifier tournament. He made his T20I debut on 15 October 2021, for Italy against Denmark.

References

External links
 

1981 births
Living people
South African cricketers
Middlesex cricketers
Western Province cricketers
Italian cricketers
Italy Twenty20 International cricketers
Hampshire cricketers
Northamptonshire cricketers
South African emigrants to Italy
Naturalised citizens of Italy
South African emigrants to the United Kingdom
Naturalised citizens of the United Kingdom
English cricketers
Italian sportspeople of African descent